Beier Ko (born 17 July 1986) is a Canadian-Singaporean former professional tennis player.

Tennis career
Beier won 1 singles title in 2002 on the ITF Women's Circuit in Toronto. In 2004, she achieved a singles ranking of #299 on the WTA Tour at 17 years old.  
 
She decided to follow the college route and played for the Harvard University Crimson varsity tennis team from 2007 to 2009. In 2009, Beier Ko was undefeated and unanimously named Ivy League Player of the Year. She was also named to All-Ivy first team in singles and doubles.

Playing for Singapore at the 2007 Fed Cup, Ko has accumulated a win–loss record of 3–2.

Personal
Ko was born in Singapore but moved with her family to Canada when she was 4 years old. In 2005, she exchanged her Canadian passport for Singapore and represented Singapore in the 2007 Fed Cup. 

In 2016, Ko married technology executive, Reed Wotiz. In 2020, she gave birth to her first son, Dylan Wotiz.

ITF Finals

Singles (1 titles, 2 runner–ups)

Fed Cup participation

Singles

Doubles

ITF junior results

Singles (2–2)

Doubles (2–1)

References

External links
 
 

1986 births
Living people
Canadian female tennis players
Singaporean female tennis players
Harvard Crimson women's tennis players
Canadian people of Singaporean descent
Singaporean expatriate sportspeople in the United States